Pottymouth is the debut studio album by the American punk rock band Bratmobile, released on June 8, 1993, by Kill Rock Stars.

Recording and release
Most of the album was recorded by Tim Green of Nation of Ulysses in July 1992, at the Embassy in Washington, DC. Green was paid with a slice of cheese pizza and a bottle of black hair dye. "Kiss & Ride", "No You Don't", and "Queenie" were recorded in August 1991 at Egg Studios in Seattle, Washington by Conrad Uno, and at YoYo Studios in Olympia, Washington by Pat Maley. Molly Neuman sings on "Richard", which was recorded in December 1992 at the Red House in Olympia, Washington by Tim Green. The album was released on June 8, 1993, by the independent record label Kill Rock Stars.

Critical reception

AllMusic reviewer Stewart Mason felt that Pottymouth "is about the early-'90s indie scene, about the D.I.Y. life in the post-Nirvana age where it seemed like anything could happen." Prominent music critic Robert Christgau of The Village Voice praised the songs "Throwaway" and "No You Don't". In January 1994, Spin placed Pottymouth in its list of 10 Best Albums of the Year You Didn't Hear.

Ira Robbins wrote approvingly in Trouser Press: "Mustering 17 songs (including a relatively protracted bash at the Runaways' seminal "Cherry Bomb") in under a half-hour, the album is like a slap in the face: it's over before you realize what you're feeling but its sting lasts a good long while."

Track listing
"Love Thing" – 1:40
"Stab" – 1:50
"Cherry Bomb" (The Runaways cover) – 1:51
"Throwaway" – 2:13
"P.R.D.C.T." – 1:53
"Some Special" – 1:40
"Fuck Yr Fans" – 1:19
"Polaroid Baby" 0:54
"Panik" – 1:43
"Bitch Theme" – 1:31
"Richard" – 1:58
"Cool Schmool" – 2:03
"Juswanna" – 1:34
"I Love You, You Little Crocodile" (hidden track) – 0:59
"Kiss & Ride" – 1:27
"No You Don't" – 1:45
"Queenie" – 1:19

Personnel
Bratmobile
 Allison Wolfe – Singer/Songwriter
 Erin Smith – Guitar, Back-up Vocals, Photography
 Molly Neuman – Drums, Photography
Technical personnel
 Patrick Maley – Engineer
 Tim Green – Engineer
 Conrad Uno – Engineer
 Ellen Smith – Photography
 Tracy Sawyer – Photography
 Panacea Theriac – Photography

References

External links

1993 debut albums
Bratmobile albums
Kill Rock Stars albums